Naomi Elizabeth Saundaus Griffiths (born 1934) is a Canadian historian. The historian John Grenier writes that she is "the premier scholar of the Acadians"  and that her "magnum opus", From Migrant to Acadian, "on the growth of Acadian society and identity is the natural starting place for any study that touches on Acadian history." She is a Distinguished Research Professor in the history department at Carleton University. From Migrant to Acadian: A North American Border People received the Lionel Groulx Prize in 2006, which recognizes the best literary work published over the last year on the history of the French in North America.

Selected works

References 

Living people
Historians of Atlantic Canada
Writers from Nova Scotia
Acadian history
Canadian women historians
20th-century Canadian historians
20th-century Canadian women writers
1934 births